, provisional designation , is a large trans-Neptunian object of the Kuiper belt in the outermost regions of the Solar System. It was discovered on 9 September 2015, by the Outer Solar System Origins Survey at Mauna Kea Observatories on the Big island of Hawaii, in the United States. The object is in a rare 2:9 resonance with Neptune and measures approximately 600 kilometers in diameter.  may have a satellite according to a study announced by Noyelles et al. in a European Planetary Science Congress meeting in 2019.

Discovery 
It was first observed by a research team led by Michele Bannister while poring over images that the Canada–France–Hawaii Telescope in Hawaii took in September 2015 as part of the Outer Solar System Origins Survey (OSSOS), and later identified in images taken at Sloan Digital Sky Survey and Pan-STARRS between 2008 and 2016. The discovery was formally announced in a Minor Planet Electronic Circular on 10 July 2016.

Numbering and naming 
This minor planet was numbered by the Minor Planet Center on 25 September 2018. As of 2021, it has not been named.

Orbit and classification 

As of 2018,  has a reasonably well defined orbit with an uncertainty of 3. It orbits the Sun at a distance of 33.8–128.6 AU once every 731 years and 6 months (for reference, Neptune's orbit is at 30 AU). Its orbit has an eccentricity of 0.58 and an inclination of 8° with respect to the ecliptic.

 is among the most distant known Solar System objects. As of 2018, it is 63 AU from the Sun. It will make its closest approach to the Sun in 2093, when it will reach an apparent magnitude of 21.2.

2:9 resonance 
Additional precovery astrometry from the Sloan Digital Sky Survey and the Pan-STARRS1 survey shows that  is a resonant trans-Neptunian object, securely trapped in a 2:9 mean motion resonance with Neptune, meaning that this minor planet orbits the Sun twice in the same amount of time it takes Neptune to complete 9 orbits. The object is unlikely to have been trapped in the 2:9 resonance for the age of Solar System. It is much more likely that it has been hopping between various resonances and got trapped in the 2:9 resonance in the last 100 million years.

Physical characteristics

Diameter and albedo 
Astronomer Michael Brown assumes an albedo of 0.11 and calculates a diameter of 626 km, while the Johnston's Archive gives a diameter of 770 kilometers, based on an assumed albedo of 0.09.
All of these estimates assume that  is a single object, the discovery of a large satellite means that the size is likely to be smaller.

Satellite 
 is suspected to be binary, though the size of the secondary body (moon) has not been determined. If the moon significantly contributes to the observed brightness of the primary, the size of  may therefore be substantially smaller than estimates that assumed the system's total brightness was from a single object; the system may be similar to that of 174567 Varda. Once the orbit of the satellite is determined, the mass and density of the  can be determined.  was observed by the Hubble Space Telescope in 2020.

References

External links 
 MPEC 2016-N67 : 2015 RR245, Minor Planet Electronic Circular – Minor Planet Center
 New Dwarf Planet, Canada–France–Hawaii Telescope
 Kuiper Belt's Big, New, Far-Out Object, Sky & Telescope
 Outer Solar System Origins Survey (OSSOS)
  
 Discovery announcement
 
 

523794
523794
523794
20150909